Prior to its uniform adoption of proportional representation in 1999, the United Kingdom used first-past-the-post for the European elections in England, Scotland and Wales. The European Parliament constituencies used under that system were smaller than the later regional constituencies and only had one Member of the European Parliament each.

The constituency of Birmingham West was one of them.

It consisted of the Westminster Parliament constituencies (on their 1983 boundaries) of Aldridge-Brownhills, Birmingham Ladywood, Birmingham Perry Barr, Sutton Coldfield, Walsall North, Walsall South, West Bromwich East, and West Bromwich West.

MEPs

Elections

References

External links
 David Boothroyd's United Kingdom Election Results 

1984 establishments in England
1999 disestablishments in England
Constituencies established in 1984
Constituencies disestablished in 1999
European Parliament constituencies in England (1979–1999)
Politics of Birmingham, West Midlands